Graeme Clement Dunstan (born 4 August 1942) is a prominent Australian cultural and political activist. 
A graduate of Essendon High School, Graeme matriculated in 1960 as dux with honours in maths, physics and chemistry.
He is an engineering graduate of the University of New South Wales (UNSW), where he was President of the Students' Union (1967) and twice co-editor of its newspaper, Tharunka, (1967 and 1971).

In 1966, while President of the UNSW Labor Club, he was active in organizing anti-Vietnam War protests. As organizer of the LBJ Welcome Committee he stopped US President Lyndon B. Johnson's motorcade in Liverpool Street, Sydney by lying under the president's car, upon which NSW Premier, Robert Askin, was reported to have said  "run over the bastards".

In 1973 with Johnny Allen as director of the Aquarius Foundation of the Australian Union of Students and Dunstan, as director of the Foundation's biennial Aquarius Festival, together they produced the Aquarius Festival which took place in Nimbin, New South Wales.

Dunstan was the first community arts officer (1981–5) employed by the City of Campbelltown and in that role set up the Friends of the Campbelltown Art Gallery which lobbied successfully to found the Campbelltown Regional Art Gallery.

In 1985–89 he was a Festivals Consultant to the Victorian Tourism Commission and in that role he was one of the initiators of the Melbourne International Comedy Festival, Ltd serving as its founding Secretary in 1987.

As a freelance event organizer, Dunstan has helped produce celebrations including the Byron Bay NYE (1995), Bondi Beach Christmas and NYE celebration 1996, Nimbin 'Let It Grow' Mardi Grass (1998 – '99), the Sunshine Coast Schoolies Week (1997), the annual Eureka Dawn Walk (1998–) and the annual Independence from America Day Parade in Byron Bay (1998–).

He is captain of Peacebus.com, which is a website and a campaign vehicle from which he organizes Cyanide Watch and other actions of witness for peace, justice and a sustaining Earth.

External links
Graeme Dunstan Curriculum Vitae

References

1942 births
Australian anti-war activists
University of New South Wales alumni
Living people